Astra Resources plc (FWB:9AR) is a UK-based mining company, the parent of Astra Mining, a producer of  raw materials related to the steel industry, including iron ore, coal, gold and other materials.

This company is now known as Incept Holdings, registered in Hong Kong. Refer to companies House UK for further information.

Astra Resources plc was dissolved in Jan 2019

T-Steel
The firm's largest asset is its 45% share in the intellectual property of T-Steel. The basic product is a combination of highly specialized processes and alloying technologies invented over 30 years ago in Hungary.  The technology is based on the modification of the metallurgical properties of steel at a molecular level. The result is a product that Astra claims is stronger, less expensive, and uses less raw materials to make than conventional steel. As of February 2011, Astra Resources's 45% IP stake in the T-Steel technology was reported to be worth $2.01 billion euros.

References

External links

ASIC Takes Action Against Astra Resources

Mining companies of Australia
Iron ore mining companies
Steel companies of Australia